Benjamin Evangelista (born 29 March 1949) is a Filipino former cyclist. He competed in the individual pursuit at the 1968 Summer Olympics.

References

External links
 

1949 births
Living people
Filipino male cyclists
Olympic cyclists of the Philippines
Cyclists at the 1968 Summer Olympics
Sportspeople from Quezon City
Cyclists at the 1966 Asian Games
Cyclists at the 1974 Asian Games
Asian Games competitors for the Philippines